Glinica may refer to the following places:

In Bosnia and Herzegovina:
 Glinica, Velika Kladuša, a village in Velika Kladuša municipality

In Poland:
Glinica, Głogów County in Lower Silesian Voivodeship (south-west Poland)
Glinica, Wrocław County in Lower Silesian Voivodeship (south-west Poland)
Glinica, Lesser Poland Voivodeship (south Poland)
Glinica, Silesian Voivodeship (south Poland)

In Slovenia:
Glinica (Ljubljana), a former settlement in central Slovenia, now part of the city of Ljubljana